Luca Sowinski (born June 5, 2004) is an American professional soccer player who plays as a midfielder for USL Championship club FC Tulsa.

Club career
Born in Carlsbad, California, Sowinski began his career with local youth club City SC Carlsbad before joining the Arizona-based Barca Residency Academy in 2019 at the age of 15. Sowinski rose through the competitive ranks and topped off his Barca Residency Academy career in June 2022 with a club-leading 15 goals and five assists in 20 appearances as he helped Barca’s U-19 side to its second consecutive MLS Next Southwest Division Championship and playoff berth. 

On July 14, 2022, despite accepting an offer to play college soccer with the Denver Pioneers, Sowinski signed a professional contract with USL Championship club FC Tulsa, becoming the youngest ever player in club history.

He made his professional debut for FC Tulsa against Detroit City on September 24,2022, starting and playing 63 minutes in the 2–2 draw. A week later in his second professional appearance, on October 1, 2022, Sowinski scored his first professional hat-trick in a 4–2 victory against Indy Eleven.

Career statistics

References

External links
 Profile at FC Tulsa

2004 births
Living people
Sportspeople from Carlsbad, California
American soccer players
Association football midfielders
FC Tulsa players
USL Championship players
Soccer players from California